João Alves de Assis Silva (born 20 March 1987), known as Jô or João Alves, is a Brazilian former professional footballer who played as a forward.

He has previously played for Corinthians, CSKA Moscow, Manchester City, Everton, Galatasaray, Internacional, Atlético Mineiro and Nagoya Grampus. Jô made his full international debut for Brazil in 2007, and was in the squads which took bronze at the 2008 Olympics and won the 2013 FIFA Confederations Cup, and also played at the 2014 FIFA World Cup.

Club career

Corinthians
Born in São Paulo, Jô played for Brazilian side Corinthians debuting at the 2003 season at the age of 16, being the youngest football player who ever played and scored a goal for the professional team. He made 54 appearances scoring 23 goals. In 2005, he was transferred to Russian club CSKA Moscow.

CSKA Moscow

Jô scored 14 goals in his first 18 appearances for CSKA Moscow. In the UEFA Champions League, Jô scored two goals in the matches against Inter Milan, one being in a dramatic 4–2 loss at the San Siro. Altogether Jô appeared in 77 games for CSKA Moscow, scoring 44 goals.

Manchester City
On 31 July 2008, Manchester City signed Jô for an undisclosed value thought to be worth about £19 million, a club record at the time. He scored just one league goal in 4 matches for Manchester City, against Portsmouth, and also scored a brace in the UEFA Cup against Omonia Nicosia. Jô found it difficult to establish himself in the City team and featured in just 6 games at the start of the 2008–09 season.

Jô joined Everton on loan in February 2009, until the end of the 2008–09 season. He made his debut at Goodison Park against Bolton Wanderers, scoring twice in a 3–0 win. He finished the season with five goals from twelve league appearances, though missed out on Everton's run to the 2009 FA Cup Final as he was cup-tied after playing the last 20 minutes of Manchester City's third round defeat to Nottingham Forest.

He returned to Manchester City at the end of the season, but re-joined Everton on a season-long loan for 2009–10, with the option of a permanent move at the end of that period. His first competitive goal in the loan spell was scored against AEK Athens in a Europa League group game, which Everton went on to win 4–0. After returning to Brazil without permission over the Christmas period, Everton manager David Moyes suspended him for a breach of conduct.

After the breach of conduct at Everton, he returned to Manchester City and was loaned to Galatasaray on the very same day. He scored three goals during his loan spell at Galatasaray.

He returned to Manchester City after his loan spell at Galatasaray expired. Jô scored in his first game back against Portland Timbers and was also successful in further pre-season friendlies against New York Red Bulls, Borussia Dortmund and Valencia CF respectively. He then went on to score in the Europa League win against Salzburg and in the League Cup loss to West Bromwich Albion, his fourth and fifth goals for the club.

On 21 November 2010 Jô made a rare start for Manchester City in his team's 4–1 win over Fulham. Jô also featured in Manchester City's 3–1 win away to West Ham before Christmas and scored City's only goal in a 1–1 draw with Juventus in the UEFA Europa League. City won the 2010–11 FA Cup, and despite being left out of the squad for the final, he contributed five appearances earlier in the cup run.

Sport Club Internacional
On 20 July 2011, following a disappointing spell at Manchester City, only scoring six goals in 41 appearances, Jô decided to return to Brazil and join Sport Club Internacional.

Atlético Mineiro
In May 2012, Jô signed with fellow Brazilian side Atlético Mineiro, where he formed a striking partnership with Ronaldinho. He won the Campeonato Mineiro and helped the club win its first Copa Libertadores title in 2013, scoring in the final game at Mineirão against Olimpia and finishing as the top scorer in the competition with 7 goals. He also played in both games of Atlético's Recopa Sudamericana win in 2014.

On 4 November 2014, after a string of acts of indiscipline, Jô was reported released from the club by officials. On 10 January 2015, however, he was reinstated to the squad along with Emerson Conceição and André, who had also been suspended, by manager Levir Culpi. On 3 May 2015, after more than 1 year without scoring a single goal, Jô came up as a substitute in the 2015 Campeonato Mineiro final against Caldense and scored the winning goal of the match from an offside position, as Atlético won 2-1 and were crowned champions of the competition for the 43rd time.

Al Shabab
In July 2015, Jô signed a deal with Emirati club Al Shabab.

Jiangsu Suning 
On 5 February 2016, Jô Joined Jiangsu Suning of the Chinese Super League.

Return to Corinthians
Jô signed a three-year deal, on 2 November 2016, to mark his return to his first club Corinthians. Despite of signing for the club in November 2016, he was only permitted to play from 2017 onwards. In 2017, the Brazilian lived a return full of uncertainties augmented by the media putting pressure on Corinthians that was mocked as being the "fourth force of São Paulo state" and his recent past of exaggerated festivities. However, he answered as a professional player performing many consistent and some delightful matches during season (2017). Jô became known as "Rei dos Clássicos" that could be translated as king of derbys, after scoring decisive goals against all of Corinthians regional rivals.

On 15 November 2017, Jô scored two goals as Corinthians beat Fluminense 3–1 and helped his team clinch the league title and this way, he confirmed his best league season scoring more than 17 goals in Campeonato Brasileiro. Corinthians obtained its seventh trophy in the competition, one of the most disputed leagues in the world; known by its traditional rivalries, fanatic supporters, athletes formation and frequent presence of its teams in Intercontinental Cup and FIFA Club World Cup.
A very curious fact that demonstrates Jô's huge change of conduct was seen after the confirmation of Corinthians 2017 league title when he literally refused a cup of beer on the pitch celebration.

Nagoya Grampus
On 3 January 2018, Nagoya Grampus announced the signing of Jô. On 24 February, he scored his first goal for the club in a 3–2 win over Gamba Osaka.
On 5 August 2018, he scored a hat-trick in a 3-2 win against Gamba Osaka. On 26 August, he scored a hat-trick again in a 4-1 win against Urawa Reds. In August 2018, he scored 10 goals in 5 matches.

Third spell at Corinthians
On 17 June 2020, Corinthians announced that Jô would make his second return to the club and wear the number 77 as an allusion to the 1977 Campeonato Paulista. Jô's third spell at Timão, however, was surrounded by controversy. The striker went to a resort during the height of the coronavirus pandemic in Brazil, wore a green boot – which indirectly alluded to rival Palmeiras – and missed training. In June 2022, after another absence, Jô and Corinthians terminated their contract.

Ceará
According to the information in the box at the beginning of this entry, striker Jô played in Ceará in 2022

Al-Jabalain
On 25 January 2023, Jô joined Saudi Arabian club Al-Jabalain. On 30 January 2023, Al-Jabalain announced that they had released Jô from his contract.

International career

Jô received his first call-up to the Brazil national football team in May 2007 and was in the squad to play against England, but did not play. He then made his international debut in a friendly against Turkey, in June 2007 aged 20.

On 7 June 2013, Jô was called to replace Leandro Damião for 2013 FIFA Confederations Cup, who was withdrawn from the original squad due to an injury. In the opening match on 15 June 2013, he scored his first international goal in a 3–0 victory over Japan. He then scored his second goal for Brazil against Mexico on 19 June 2013.

Jô was selected in the Brazilian squad for the 2014 FIFA World Cup. He made his first appearance in the competition in the second group game, coming on for the last 22 minutes in place of Fred in a goalless draw with Mexico. He made another substitute appearance for the same player in the Round of 16 match against Chile, and played the full 90 minutes of the third-place play-off defeat to the Netherlands.

After  Tite was appointed manager of the Brazil national  team, Jô believes he can be called up again to Seleção. According to him, it only depends on his working for Corinthians, club where he came back to play for in 2017.

Career statistics

Club

International
Appearances and goals by national team and year

Statistics accurate as of match played 12 July 2014

Scores and results list Brazil's goal tally first.
International goals

Honours
Corinthians
 Campeonato Brasileiro Série A: 2005, 2017
 Campeonato Paulista: 2017

CSKA Moscow
 Russian Premier League: 2006
 Russian Cup: 2005–06, 2007–08
 Russian Super Cup: 2006, 2007

Manchester City
 FA Cup: 2010-11

Internacional
 Campeonato Gaúcho: 2012
 Recopa Sudamericana: 2011

Atlético Mineiro
 Copa do Brasil: 2014
 Campeonato Mineiro: 2013, 2015
 Copa Libertadores: 2013
 Recopa Sudamericana: 2014
Brazil U23
 Olympic Men's Football Bronze: 2008

Brazil
 FIFA Confederations Cup: 2013
Individual
Copa Libertadores Top Scorer: 2013
Campeonato Paulista Team of the year: 2017
Bola de Prata: 2017
Bola de Ouro: 2017
Campeonato Brasileiro Série A Top Scorer: 2017
Campeonato Brasileiro Série A Best Player: 2017
Campeonato Brasileiro Série A Team of the Year: 2017
J.League Player of the Month: August 2018
J.League Top Scorer: 2018
J.League Best XI: 2018

References

External links

 
 
 
 
 

1987 births
Living people
Footballers from São Paulo
Brazilian footballers
Association football forwards
Sport Club Corinthians Paulista players
PFC CSKA Moscow players
Manchester City F.C. players
Everton F.C. players
Galatasaray S.K. footballers
Sport Club Internacional players
Clube Atlético Mineiro players
Al Shabab Al Arabi Club Dubai players
Jiangsu F.C. players
Nagoya Grampus players
Ceará Sporting Club players
Al-Jabalain FC players
Campeonato Brasileiro Série A players
Russian Premier League players
Premier League players
Süper Lig players
UAE Pro League players
Chinese Super League players
J1 League players
Saudi First Division League players
Brazil youth international footballers
Brazil under-20 international footballers
Olympic footballers of Brazil
Brazil international footballers
Footballers at the 2008 Summer Olympics
2013 FIFA Confederations Cup players
2014 FIFA World Cup players
Medalists at the 2008 Summer Olympics
Olympic bronze medalists for Brazil
Olympic medalists in football
Copa Libertadores-winning players
FIFA Confederations Cup-winning players
Brazilian expatriate footballers
Brazilian expatriate sportspeople in Russia
Brazilian expatriate sportspeople in England
Brazilian expatriate sportspeople in Turkey
Brazilian expatriate sportspeople in the United Arab Emirates
Brazilian expatriate sportspeople in China
Brazilian expatriate sportspeople in Japan
Brazilian expatriate sportspeople in Saudi Arabia
Expatriate footballers in Russia
Expatriate footballers in England
Expatriate footballers in Turkey
Expatriate footballers in the United Arab Emirates
Expatriate footballers in China
Expatriate footballers in Japan
Expatriate footballers in Saudi Arabia